Hjart Island is an island lying  west of the Skallen Hills in the eastern part of Lützow-Holm Bay, Antarctica. It was mapped by Norwegian cartographers from air photos taken by the Lars Christensen Expedition, 1936–37, and named Hjartoy (heart island) because of its shape.

See also 
 List of antarctic and sub-antarctic islands

References

Islands of Queen Maud Land
Prince Harald Coast